Eleanor Reissa is an American actress, singer, theatre director, playwright, librettist, choreographer, translator, and author based in New York City. She works and performs in English and Yiddish speaking stages, and also interprets and performs Yiddish theatre and songs.

Background and Education 

Eleanor Reissa was born in Brooklyn, New York. However, her parents were born in Poland. During WW2, they were both placed in German ghettos established in occupied Poland, and fought and lived through the Holocaust. In America, they were both considered sweatshop workers. Hence, Reissa studied in the New York City public school system and received her Bachelor of Arts in Speech and Theatre at Brooklyn College, graduating cum laude.

Directing and acting 

Reissa's directing debut in Broadway garnered her a Tony Award nomination for Those Were the Days, which she also choreographed and starred in. Other New York directing credits include: Cowgirls (1995 Outer Critics Circle Award nomination), Echoes of the War (2005 Drama Desk Award nomination), and The Soldier's Wife (two 2006 Drama Desk Award nominations). In Yiddish, her New York directing credits include: Got Fun Nekome (God of Vengeance), Hershele Ostropolyer (adapted by Reissa), Zise Khaloymes (based on her English language play, Sweet Dreams), and Yoshke Muzikant: The Klezmer’s Tale. Furthermore, she was artistic director of the National Yiddish Theatre Folksbiene for five years.

On Broadway, she was in the cast of Paula Vogel's Indecent, and was nominated for a Tony Award as the director of the musical Those Were the Days (which she also choreographed and starred in).

In April 2019, Reissa directed, co-created and featured as a vocalist in From Shtetl to Stage: A Celebration of Yiddish Music and Culture at Carnegie Hall.

Music and recordings 

Reissa has also sung in numerous American musicals in the theatre, including Tintypes, The Rise of David Levinsky, and Fiddler on the Roof.

Reissa's singing in Yiddish has earned her the title of the "Reigning Queen of Yiddish Cabaret". Additionally, she has been featured in Pearls of Yiddish Song, Remember the Children, Going Home: Gems of Yiddish Song, Songs in the Key of Yiddish, and in 2015, Just Add Water (Eleanor Reissa and Di Boyess).

She has collaborated with Frank London of the Klezmatics and the Klezmer Brass Allstars, to perform together internationally. Along with the Klezmatics, she recorded Vilde Mekhaye (Wild Ecstasy) in 2016. They have also performed in festivals and venues including Berlin, Toronto, Paris, Vienna, and in New York City at Joe's Pub and Feinstein's/54 Below.

She and Frank London performed their program Kurt Weill in New York at the Kurt Weill Festival in Dessau, (Germany) featuring Anthony Coleman, Greg Cohen, and Billy Martin.

Playwriting

For her playwriting, Reissa received the Dorothy Silver Playwriting Award for Wishful Thinking, and then was shortlisted as a finalist for her play, Thicker Than Water a few years later. Reissa's plays have been published in an anthology called The Last Survivor and other Modern Yiddish Plays. Her play, The Last Dinosaur, was listed as finalist for the Actors Theatre of Louisville’s Heideman Award.

Adaptations and Translations

Reissa was commissioned to adapt the story The Adventures of Hershele Ostropolyer (also known as Hershel of Ostropol) as a musical for the National Yiddish Theatre,  Folksbiene, where it was played for two consecutive seasons, starring Mike Burstyn. It was then performed in Israel at Yiddishpiel, the same location where it was nominated for the Israel Prize as well. After this, Reissa was also commissioned by Yiddishpiel to adapt the 1937 film, Yidl Mitn Fidl to a stage musical in 2014, where it has a successful run.

In 2019, Reissa also received a commission by the National Yiddish Theatre, Folksbiene to translate Paddy Chayevsky’s The Tenth Man, into Yiddish (with Harvey Varga), which was slated for the 2020 season with her as director.

She also worked on the libretto for the opera Taibele and Her Demon, based on the short story by Isaac Bashevis Singer, with composer, Judd Greenstein

The Letters Project: A Daughter’s Journey
After the death of her mother, Reissa found letters sent by her father, a survivor of Auschwitz, in the late 1940s to her mother, a survivor of a slave labor camp in Uzbekistan. She eventually had them translated and traveled to Germany, later writing The Letters Project: A Daughter’s Journey, which was published by Post Hill Press in 2022.

Directing

Theater acting (partial list)

Film and television acting (partial list)

Music/recordings list

 Pearls of Yiddish Song (1990)
 Remember the Children (1991)
 Going Home: Gems of Yiddish Song (1992)
 Songs in the Key of Yiddish (2002)
 Just Add Water with Di Boyess (2015)
 Wild Ecstasy (Vilde Mekhaye)' with Frank London (2017)

References

External links
 
 Eleanor Reissa at Broadway World

Actresses from New York City
Singers from New York City
Yiddish-language singers of the United States
American theatre directors
Women theatre directors
21st-century American women singers
20th-century American singers
20th-century American actresses
21st-century American actresses
20th-century American dramatists and playwrights
21st-century American dramatists and playwrights
Jewish American dramatists and playwrights
American women dramatists and playwrights
American musical theatre librettists
American women choreographers
American choreographers
American translators
Broadway theatre directors
Year of birth missing (living people)
Living people
Brooklyn College alumni
20th-century American women singers
21st-century American singers
21st-century American Jews
Jewish women singers
American people of Polish-Jewish descent
Jewish translators